Steve Myddelton (born July 27, 1986 in Barrie, Ontario) is a retired professional Canadian football offensive lineman. He was drafted by the Calgary Stampeders in the fourth round of the 2009 CFL Draft and played for parts of five seasons for that team before being traded to the BC Lions on August 5, 2013. He played CIS football for the St. Francis Xavier X-Men.

External links
Just Sports Stats
Edmonton Eskimos bio 

1986 births
Living people
BC Lions players
Canadian football offensive linemen
Calgary Stampeders players
Edmonton Elks players
Hamilton Tiger-Cats players
Players of Canadian football from Ontario
St. Francis Xavier X-Men football players
Sportspeople from Barrie